Camicia Nera was one of nineteen s built for the  (Royal Italian Navy) in the late 1930s and early 1940s. Completed in 1938, she was the first ship of the first batch of a dozen ships to enter service. In July 1943, due to the fall of the Fascist regime she was renamed Artigliere, a name formerly held by a sister ship that had been sunk 3 years earlier. She was transferred to the Soviet Navy as a war reparation in 1950, renamed Lyogkyy, and expended as a target in 1954.

Design and description
The Soldati-class destroyers were slightly improved versions of the preceding . Their wartime complement during was 206 officers and enlisted men.

Camicia Nera was powered by two Parsons geared steam turbines, each driving one propeller shaft using steam supplied by three Yarrow boilers.

Camicia Neras main battery consisted of four 50-caliber  guns in two twin-gun turrets, one each fore and aft of the superstructure. On a platform amidships was a 15-caliber 120-millimeter star shell gun. Anti-aircraft (AA) defense for the Soldatis was provided by eight  Breda Model 1935 guns. The ships were equipped with six  torpedo tubes in two triple mounts amidships. Although they were not provided with a sonar system for anti-submarine work, they were fitted with a pair of depth charge throwers. The ships could carry 48 mines.

Citations

Bibliography

External links
 Camicia Nera / Artigliere (1943) Marina Militare website

Soldati-class destroyers
Ships built in Livorno
1937 ships
World War II destroyers of Italy